Three Wells is an open-air museum in Ukraine.

'Three Wells may also refer to:

Places
Uchquduq, "Three Wells", a city in Uzbekistan
Tres Pozos, "Three Wells", a town ion Argentina
Drei Brunnen, "Three Wells", the source of the river Kaltenmühlbach, Germany
 Three Wells near Broomehill, the source of Gordon River (Western Australia)
 Three Wells, a settlement in Buerton, Cheshire East, England
 "The Three Wells", a sacred place in Kilmovee, Ireland
Three Wells Round Cairn, a Scheduled Monument in Monmouthshire

Other
Mitsui (surname), a Japanese surname literally meaning "three wells"
Three wells beneath the world tree Yggdrasil, see Urðarbrunnr
Uchquduq - Three Wells, a song by Uzbek band Yalla

See also
"Three houses and three wells", the Three utilities problem
Two Wells